Paul Edmond Messier (born January 27, 1958) is a British-born Canadian former professional ice hockey player. He is the older brother of the NHL player Mark Messier.

Early life 
Messier was born in Nottingham, England. His family moved to Canada when he was young and he grew up playing ice hockey in the Edmonton minor system.

Career 
Messier played for the University of Denver and briefly in the National Hockey League for the Colorado Rockies. In 1994, he was head coach and general manager of the Tampa Bay Tritons, a professional roller hockey team that played in Roller Hockey International for one season. His brother, Mark, was the team's owner.

Personal life
Messier has two children from a previous marriage. He manages one of his brother's investments, a small hotel in Harbour Island, Bahamas.

Career statistics

Regular season and playoffs

See also
List of National Hockey League players from the United Kingdom

References

External links
 

1958 births
Living people
Adler Mannheim players
Binghamton Whalers players
Birmingham Bulls (CHL) players
Bolzano HC players
Canadian ice hockey centres
Colorado Rockies (NHL) draft picks
Colorado Rockies (NHL) players
Denver Pioneers men's ice hockey players
ECD Iserlohn players
Edmonton Mets players
Edmonton Oil Kings (WCHL) players
Edmonton Oilers scouts
English ice hockey players
Fort Worth Texans players
Franco-Albertan people
Ice hockey people from Alberta
Moncton Alpines (AHL) players
Philadelphia Firebirds (AHL) players
Sportspeople from St. Albert, Alberta
Spruce Grove Mets players
Tulsa Oilers (1964–1984) players
Wichita Wind players
Canadian expatriate ice hockey players in the United States
Canadian expatriate ice hockey players in West Germany
Canadian expatriate ice hockey players in Italy
Canadian ice hockey coaches